James 1 is the first chapter of the Epistle of James in the New Testament of the Christian Bible. The author identifies himself as "James, a servant of God and of the Lord Jesus Christ" and the epistle is traditionally attributed to James the brother of Jesus, written in Jerusalem between AD 48 and 61. Alternatively, some scholars argue that it is a pseudographical work written after AD 61.

This chapter contains the letter prescript, an exposition about the joy in temptations, related to three connected actions: hearing, speaking and doing.

Text and interpretation

The original text was written in Koine Greek. This chapter is divided into 27 verses.

Verse 1

"James": identified by early church leaders (Eusebius, Origen, etc.) to be James the Just (the brother of Jesus), who was a distinguished leader of the first-century church in Jerusalem. He was the oldest of the four brothers of Jesus either born from Joseph  or Clopas and Mary, aunt of Jesus if identified as James the Less. He did not believe in Jesus as Christ until after the resurrection, perhaps as a result of a special post-resurrection appearance of Jesus to him.

"Servant": is 'a title of authority' (cf. ; ; ; Philippians 1:1). Bauckham suggests that James does not state his family relationship to Jesus because he does not see it as a basis for authority (cf. ).

Verse 4

"Perfect" (used two times here) and "complete" point to the theme of "maturity".

Verse 5

"Wisdom" can be rendered as "skill for living", not 'primarily knowledge', but 'godly behavior in difficult situations' (cf. ).

Verse 12

"Blessed" here is in the sense of "to be richly rewarded by God" both in the current world (after character development in 1:4), and the next (Matthew 5:11–12).

Verse 13

"Tempted": different from the previous use, as 'exercising grace' in relation to joy and boasting, here the "temptations" are the 'issue of shame and death', that is 'to be watched against'.

"Tempted by God" (NKJV; KJV: "Tempted of God"): A holy God without iniquity does not delight in sin, being contrary to his nature and perfection, so he will not tempt another to sin. Sinful men often charge God for their sins, or temptations to sin, similar to Adam, when fallen who, to excuse himself, lays the blame to Eve ("the woman"), and ultimately to God, who gave her to him; suggesting that if it had not been for the woman (had God not given him the woman to be with him), he should not have eaten of the forbidden fruit, nor should he have had any temptation to it, and therefore it was God's fault.
"God cannot be tempted with evil" or "evils": the Israelites tempted God at Massah and Meribah, with their murmuring, distrust and unbelief, poking God's patience and his power; and Jesus has been tempted by evil men, and by evil things, but he cannot be tempted "to evil" (as rendered in the Ethiopian version), nor can he be tempted by anything in himself, who is pure and holy, or by anything, to do any sinful action:

"Nor does He Himself tempt anyone": that is, 'to sin'. God tempted Abraham, to try his faith, love, and obedience to God; he tempted the Israelites in the wilderness, to humble them, and prove what was in their hearts; and he tempted Job, and tried his faith and patience; and so God 'tempts and tries' his righteous people, by afflictions, more or less: but he never tempts or solicits them to sin; temptations to sin come from another direction.

Verse 27

"Keep oneself from being polluted by the world": in the sense of not looking for security or advancement in the things valued by the people in the world, such as 'no need to hold on to money', so Christians can be give freely and generously.

Textual witnesses
Some early manuscripts containing the text of this chapter in Greek are:
Papyrus 23 (~AD 250; extant verses 10–12, 15–18)
Codex Vaticanus (325-350)
Codex Sinaiticus (330-360)
Codex Alexandrinus (400-440)
Codex Ephraemi Rescriptus (ca. 450; extant verses 3-27)

An ancient manuscript containing this chapter in the Coptic language is: 
Papyrus 6 (~AD 350; extant verses 13–27).

Latter Day Saint usage

James 1:5 has particular importance in the Latter Day Saint tradition. The reading of it by the young Joseph Smith is often cited as the precipitating event for the First Vision, and thus of the Restoration.

David O. McKay, ninth president of the Church of Jesus Christ of Latter-day Saints, said that in "this scripture lies the secret of Joseph Smith's emergence from obscurity to world-wide renown." Russell M. Nelson, the 17th and current president of the Church, has cited it stating that "Joseph Smith set a pattern for us to follow in resolving our questions."

See also
 Jesus
 Temptation

References

Sources

External links
 King James Bible - Wikisource
English Translation with Parallel Latin Vulgate 
Online Bible at GospelHall.org (ESV, KJV, Darby, American Standard Version, Bible in Basic English)
Multiple bible versions at Bible Gateway (NKJV, NIV, NRSV etc.)

01